Gastón Revol (born November 26, 1986) is an Argentine rugby union player. He debuted at the 2009 London Sevens. Revol captained  at the 2016 Summer Olympics. He also captained Argentina again at the 2022 Rugby World Cup Sevens in Cape Town.

References

External links 
 
 
 
 
 
 

1986 births
Living people
Argentine rugby union players
Argentine people of French descent
Argentina international rugby sevens players
Male rugby sevens players
Olympic rugby sevens players of Argentina
Rugby sevens players at the 2016 Summer Olympics
Pan American Games medalists in rugby sevens
Pan American Games silver medalists for Argentina
World Games silver medalists
Competitors at the 2013 World Games
Rugby sevens players at the 2015 Pan American Games
Medalists at the 2015 Pan American Games
Rugby sevens players at the 2020 Summer Olympics
Olympic medalists in rugby sevens
Medalists at the 2020 Summer Olympics
Olympic bronze medalists for Argentina
Sportspeople from Córdoba, Argentina